Bruno Jakob Thüring (7 September 1905, in Warmensteinach – 6 May 1989, in Karlsruhe) was a German physicist and astronomer.

Thüring studied mathematics, physics, and astronomy at the University of Munich and received his doctorate in 1928, under Alexander Wilkens and Arnold Sommerfeld. Wilkens was professor of astronomy and director of the Munich Observatory, which was part of the University. From 1928 to 1933, he was an assistant at the Munich Observatory. From 1934 to 1935, he was an assistant to Heinrich Vogt at the University of Heidelberg. Thüring completed his Habilitation there in 1935, whereupon he became an Observator at the Munich Observatory. In 1937, Thüring became a lecturer (Dozent) at the University of Munich. From 1940 to 1945, he held the chair for astronomy at the University of Vienna and was director of the Vienna Observatory. After 1945, Thüring lived as a private scholar in Karlsruhe.

During the reign of Adolf Hitler, Thüring was a proponent of Deutsche Physik, as were the two Nobel Prize–winning physicists Johannes Stark and Philipp Lenard; Deutsche Physik, was anti-Semitic and had a bias against theoretical physics, especially including quantum mechanics. He was also a student of the philosophy of Hugo Dingler.

Thüring was an opponent of Albert Einstein's theory of relativity.

Books 
 Bruno Thüring  (Georg Lüttke Verlag, 1941)
 Bruno Thüring  (Göller, 1957)
 Bruno Thüring  (Göller, 1958)
 Bruno Thüring  (Duncker u. Humblot GmbH, 1967)
 Bruno Thüring  (Duncker & Humblot GmbH, 1978)
 Bruno Thüring  (Haag u. Herchen, 1985)

Notes

References 
 Clark, Ronald W. Einstein: The Life and Times (World, 1971)

1905 births
1989 deaths
20th-century German physicists
20th-century German astronomers
Academic staff of Heidelberg University
Ludwig Maximilian University of Munich alumni
Academic staff of the Ludwig Maximilian University of Munich
People from the Kingdom of Bavaria
Relativity critics
Science teachers
Academic staff of the University of Vienna